The Cleveland Army Cadet Force (Cleveland ACF) is the county cadet force for Cleveland that operates as part of the Army Cadet Force. Although the county of Cleveland was disestablished in 1996, the unit still maintains the name and recruits from its former area, which is now part of the North Riding of Yorkshire and Durham.

History

Background 
In 1863, along with the formation of the Volunteer Force, the first government sanctioned cadet groups were allowed to be formed.  These groups would mostly be formed in connection with existing volunteer companies and battalions.  Following the Territorial and Reserve Forces Act 1907 which organised the former Volunteer Force into a coherent organisation, known as the Territorial Force (TF), the cadets were expanded.  Each company consisted of no less than 30 cadets, and four of these companies formed a "Cadet Battalion", the predecessors to the modern "Cadet County".

Unlike their modern successors, the first cadet battalions were administered by their local County Territorial Force Associations, and rarely ever came under an "army command".  However, following changes to the organisation of the Cadets, in 1923 all cadet forces were taken under complete control of the County Associations.

County 
Following the Local Government Act of 1974 (c.70), the non-metropolitan county of Cleveland was formed from the Stockton Rural District (Hartlepool) of Durham and the unitary authority area of Redcar and Cleveland of the North Riding of Yorkshire.

The first mention of the 'Cleveland Army Cadet Force' appears in a supplement to the London Gazette dated 22 October 1974 with the first appointment of an officer.

Under the Army 2020 programme, the 4th Mechanised Brigade was merged with 15th (North East) Brigade to form the new 4th Infantry Brigade and Headquarters North East on 1 April 2014.  Following these changes, the county left the control of the 15th (North East) Brigade and joined 4th Infantry Brigade as part of Headquarters North East.

As of December 2021, each Army Cadet Force county reports to their local brigade deputy commander, or in the case of independent regional headquarters the commander.  However, for administrative duties each cadet county reports to Commander Cadets, who is a senior 1* Brigadier part of Headquarters, Regional Command.

Organisation 
Each Army Cadet Force 'county' is in-fact a battalion, and each 'detachment' equivalent to that of a platoon.  The Cleveland ACF is currently divided into three companies, with multiple detachments spread throughout the Cleveland area:
 Cleveland Army Cadet Force County Headquarters, at the Coulby Newham Army Reserve Centre, Middlesbrough
 Cleveland Army Cadet Force County Training Team, at the Coulby Newham Army Reserve Centre, Middlesbrough

Notable Events 
In July 2018, more than 70 personnel from the Cleveland ACF went to Northern Ireland for a chance to win the Duke of Edinburgh's Award, but eight had to be evacuated after being isolated and exposed to the elements. The army later issued a formal apology and stated 'we failed cadets left stranded on mountains'.

ACF Mission 
The Army Cadet Force is a national, voluntary, uniformed youth organisation. It is sponsored by the British Army but not part of it and neither the cadets nor the adult volunteer leaders are subject to military call-up.  They offer a broad range of challenging adventurous and educational activities, some of them on a military theme. Their aim is to inspire young people to achieve success in life and develop in them the qualities of a good citizen.

The ACF can be compared to their counterparts in the Junior Reserve Officers' Training Corps (USA), Hong Kong Adventure Corps, and Canadian Army Cadets, amongst others.

Role & Affiliations 
The Cleveland Army Cadet Force has over 650 cadets and adult volunteers in detachments all across Cleveland.

Prior to 2006, the county was affiliated with the North Yorkshire Regiment (Green Howards). From 2006, following the formation of that regiment, the county was affiliated with the Yorkshire Regiment, except for 4 detachments which are affiliated with the Royal Engineers, The Rifles, and Royal Military Police.

Honorary Colonels 
Honorary Colonels of the county have included:

 – 17 May 2007: Colonel A. W. Illingworth 
 17 May 2007 – 1 July 2010: Colonel A. Wilson 
 1 July 2010 – before 1 July 2017 (vacant till then): Mr. Alasdair MacConachie 
 1 July 2017 – 1 July 2020: Mr. Richard Kilty
 1 July 2020 – present: Colonel V. B. Jassal

See also 

 List of Army Cadet Force units
 Combined Cadet Force

Footnotes

Notes

Citations

References 

 

Military units and formations in the North Riding of Yorkshire
Military units and formations in Stockton-on-Tees
Military units and formations in Middlesbrough
Military units and formations in Hartlepool
Military units and formations in County Durham
Army Cadet Force counties
Military units and formations established in 1974